The old Coosa County Jail is a former jail in Rockford, Alabama.  It is the oldest extant stone jail in Alabama.

Construction of the jail was authorized in 1839, four years after the county seat of Coosa County was moved to Rockford.  It was completed in August 1842, at a cost of $2,745 ($ in today's dollars).  The jail is 20 by 40 feet (6 by 12 meters), with a chimney on one end.  There are two doors, on the north and east sides.

It was added to the National Register of Historic Places in 1974.

References

Jails on the National Register of Historic Places in Alabama
Government buildings completed in 1842
Buildings and structures in Coosa County, Alabama
National Register of Historic Places in Coosa County, Alabama
Jails in Alabama
1842 establishments in Alabama